The Satyrini is one of the tribes of the subfamily Satyrinae. It includes about 2200 species and is therefore the largest tribe in the subfamily which comprises 2500 species.

Distribution 
Satyrini butterflies have a worldwide distribution, but the distribution pattern differs between subtribes. Some subtribes are almost restricted to a single biogeographic region, such as the Pronophilina, which is found only in Andean cloud forests from Venezuela to Bolivia.

Biology 
The larval food plants of many species in this tribe are grasses, i.e. Poaceae. It is considered that the Satyrini diversified at about the same time as the grasses did, and that the radiation of the tribe is therefore closely related to the evolution of the grasses.

In contrast, the tribe has a few genera which show uncommon feeding preferences. Three genera, Euptychia, Ragadia and Acrophtalmia, feed on Lycopsida, and moreover, some species of Euptychia have been reported to feed on mosses of Neckeraceae. This is interesting cases as these genera are not considered to be very closely related to each other.

Taxonomy 

The taxonomy of the subfamily Satyrinae has recently undergone a significant revision.  showed that most of the traditionally well known group are paraphyletic or polyphyletic and developed a new taxonomy, based on molecular phylogenetic. The classification scheme transferred many genera traditionally placed in the Elymniini to the Satyrini, and later studies have largely followed this classification. Thus, the Satyrini is now considered to include the genera previously placed in the Elymniini, such as Lethe, Pararge and Mycalesis. However, the phylogenetic statuses of some subtribes within the tribe are still unclear and the revision of the classification is likely to continue.

 Parargina Moore, 1893
 Chonala Moore, 1893
 Kirinia Westwood, 1841
 Lasiommata Tutt, 1896
 Lopinga Moore, 1893
 Orinoma Gray, 1846
 Pararge Hübner, 1819
 Rhaphicera Butler, 1867
 Tatinga Moore, 1893
 Nosea Moore, 1893
 Lethina Reuter, 1896
 Aphysoneura Karsch, 1894
 Lethe Hübner, 1819
 Neope Moore, 1866
 Ninguta Moore, 1892
 Ptychandra Felder & Felder, 1861
 Mandarinia Leech, 1892
 Mycalesina Reuter, 1896
 Lohora Moore, 1880
 Brakefieldia Aduse-Poku, Lees & Wahlberg, 2016
 Telinga Moore, 1880
 Heteropsis Westwood, 1850
 Culapa Moore, 1879
 Mydosama Moore, 1880
 Mycalesis Hübner, 1818
 Devyatkinia Monastyrskii & Uémura, 2016
 Hallelesis Condamin, 1961
 Bicyclus Kirby, 1871
 Eritina Miller, 1968
 Coelites Westwood, 1850
 Erites Westwood, 1851
 Orsotriaena Wallengren, 1858
 Zipaetis Hewitson, 1863
 Ragadiina Herrich-Schäffer, 1864
 Acrophtalmia Felder & Felder, 1861
 Acropolis Hemming, 1934
 Ragadia Westwood, 1851
 Coenonymphina Tutt, 1896
 Coenonympha Hübner, 1819
 Sinonympha Lee, 1994
 Oressinoma Doubleday, 1849
 Altiapa Parsons, 1986
 Argynnina Butler, 1867
 Argyronympha Mathew, 1886
 Argyrophenga Doubleday, 1845
 Dodonidia Butler, 1884
 Erebiola Fereday, 1879
 Erycinidia Rothschild & Jordan, 1905
 Geitoneura Butler, 1867
 Harsiesis Fruhstorfer, 1911
 Heteronympha Wallengren, 1858
 Hyalodia Jordan, 1924
 Hypocysta Westwood, 1851
 Lamprolenis Godman & Salvin, 1881
 Nesoxenica Waterhouse & Lyell, 1914
 Oreixenica Waterhouse & Lyell, 1914
 Paratisiphone Watkins, 1928
 Percnodaimon Butler, 1876
 Platypthima Rothschild & Jordan, 1905
 Tisiphone Hübner, 1819
 Euptychiina Reuter, 1896
 Euptychia Hübner, 1818
 Palaeonympha Butler, 1871
 Amphidecta Butler, 1867
 Archeuptychia Forster, 1964
 Amiga Nakahara, Willmott & Espeland, 2019
 Caeruleuptychia Forster, 1964
 Capronnieria Forster, 1964
 Cepheuptychia Forster, 1964
 Chloreuptychia Forster, 1964
 Cissia Doubleday, 1848
 Coeruleotaygetis Forster, 1964
 Cyllopsis Felder, 1869
 Erichthodes Forster, 1964
 Euptychoides Forster, 1964
 Forsterinaria Gray, 1973
 Graphita Nakahara, Marín & Barbosa 2016
 Godartiana Forster, 1964
 Harjesia Forster, 1964
 Hermeuptychia Forster, 1964
 Huberonympha Viloria & Costa, 2016
 Inbio Nakahara & Espeland, 2015
 Magneuptychia Forster, 1964
 Megeuptychia Forster, 1964
 Megisto Hübner, 1819
 Moneuptychia Forsterm, 1964
 Neonympha Hübner 1818
 Nhambikuara Freitas, Barbosa & Zacca, 2018
 Optimandes Marín, Nakahara & Willmott, 2019
 Orotaygetis Nakahara & Zacca, 2018
 Paramacera Butler, 1868
 Parataygetis Forster, 1964
 Pareuptychia Forster, 1964
 Paryphthimoides Forster, 1964
 Pharneuptychia Forster, 1964
 Pindis Felder, 1869
 Posttaygetis Forster, 1964
 Prenda Freitas & Mielke, 2011
 Pseudeuptychia Forster, 1964
 Pseudodebis Forster, 1964
 Rareuptychia Forster, 1964
 Satyrotaygetis Forster, 1964
 Sepona Freitas & Barbosa, 2016
 Splendeuptychia Forster, 1964
 Stegosatyrus Zacca, Mielke & Pyrcz, 2013
 Stevenaria Viloria, Costa, Neild & Nakahara, 2016
 Taydebis Freitas, 2003
 Taygetina Forster, 1964
 Taygetis Hübner, 1819
 Taygetomorpha Miller, 2004
 Yphthimoides Forster, 1964
 Zischkaia Forster, 1964
 Erebiina Tutt, 1896
 Erebia Elwes, 1899
 Maniolina Grote, 1897
 Aphantopus Wallengren, 1853
 Cercyonis Scudder, 1875
 Hyponephele Muschamp, 1915
 Maniola Schrank, 1801
 Pyronia Hübner, 1819
 Melanargiina Wheeler, 1903
 Melanargia Meigen, 1828
 Pronophilina Reuter, 1896
 Altopedaliodes Forster, 1964
 Antopedaliodes Forster, 1964
 Apexacuta Pyrcz, 2004
 Arhuaco Adams & Bernard, 1977
 Cheimas Thieme, 1907
 Corades Doubleday, 1849
 Corderopedaliodes Forster, 1964
 Daedalma Hewitson, 1858
 Dangond Adams & Bernard, 1979
 Drucina Butler, 1872
 Druphila Pyrcz, 2004
 Eretris Thieme, 1905
 Eteona Doubleday, 1848
 Foetterleia Viloria, 2004
 Junea Hemming, 1964
 Lasiophila Felder & Felder, 1859
 Lymanopoda Westwood, 1851
 Mygona Thieme, 1907
 Neopedaliodes Viloria, Miller & Miller 2004
 Oxeoschistus Butler, 1867
 Panyapedaliodes Forster, 1964
 Paramo Adams & Bernard, 1977
 Parapedaliodes Forster, 1964
 Pedaliodes Butler, 1867
 Pherepedaliodes Forster, 1964
 Physcopedaliodes Forster, 1964
 Praepedaliodes Forster, 1964
 Praepronophila Forster, 1964
 Proboscis Thieme, 1907
 Pronophila Doubleday, 1849
 Protopedaliodes Viloria & Pyrcz, 1994
 Pseudomaniola Röber, 1889
 Punapedaliodes Forster, 1964
 Steremnia Thieme, 1905
 Steroma Westwood, 1850
 Steromapedaliodes Forster, 1964
 Thiemeia Weymer, 1912
 Diaphanos Adams & Bernard, 1981
 Ianussiusa Pyrcz & Viloria, 2004
 Idioneurula Strand, 1932
 Manerebia Staudinger, 1897
 Neomaniola Hayward, 1949
 Argyrophorus Blanchard, 1852
 Auca Hayward, 1953
 Chillanella Herrera, 1966
 Cosmosatyrus Felder & Felder, 1867
 Elina Blanchard, 1852
 Faunula Felder & Felder, 1867
 Haywardella Herrera, 1966
 Homoeonympha Felder & Felder, 1867
 Nelia Hayward, 1953
 Neomaenas Wallengren, 1858
 Neosatyrus Wallengren, 1858
 Pampasatyrus Hayward, 1953
 Quilaphoestosus Herrera, 1966
 Spinantenna Hayward, 1953
 Tetraphlebia Felder & Felder, 1867
 Gyrocheilus Butler, 1867
 Satyrina Boisduval, 1833
 Argestina Riley, 1923
 Davidina Oberthür, 1879
 Berberia de Lesse, 1951
 Hipparchia Fabricius, 1807
 Kanetisa Moore, 1893
 Aulocera Butler, 1867
 Karanasa Moore, 1893
 Oeneis Hübner, 1819
 Paroeneis Moore, 1893
 Arethusana de Lesse, 1951
 Brintesia Fruhstorfer, 1911
 Minois Hübner, 1819
 Chazara Moore, 1893
 Pseudochazara de Lesse, 1951
 Satyrus Latreille, 1810
 Ypthimina Reuter, 1896
 Cassionympha van Son, 1955
 Coenyra Hewitson, 1865
 Coenyropsis van Son, 1958
 Mashuna van Son, 1955
 Mashunoides Mendes & Bivar de Sousa, 2009
 Melampias Hübner, 1819
 Neita van Son, 1955
 Neocoenyra Butler, 1886
 Pseudonympha Wallengren, 1857
 Paternympha Henning & Henning, 1997
 Physcaeneura Wallengren, 1857
 Strabena Mabille, 1877
 Stygionympha van Son, 1955
 Ypthima Hübner, 1818
 Austroypthima Holloway, 1974
 Ypthimomorpha van Son, 1955
 subtribe uncertain
 Calisto Hübner, 1823
 Paralasa Moore, 1893
 Callerebia Butler, 1867
 Proterebia Roos & Amschied, 1980
 Loxerebia Watkins, 1925
 Dyndirus Capronnier, 1874

Notes

References

Citations

Sources

External links 
 Satyrinae at NYMPHALIDAE.net (There is no individual page for Satyrini as it is split into pages for each subtribes.)
 Boisduval 1833 at TREE OF LIFE web project
 ジャノメチョウ族（Satyrini）のページ at Pteron World (in Japanese)

 
Satyrinae
Butterfly tribes